The 1950 UCLA Bruins football team was an American football team that represented the University of California, Los Angeles during the 1950 college football season. In their second year under head coach Red Sanders, the Bruins compiled a 6–3 record (5–2 conference) and finished in third place in the Pacific Coast Conference.

Schedule

References

UCLA
UCLA Bruins football seasons
UCLA Bruins football
UCLA Bruins football